Bluebell Creek can refer to:

Bluebell Creek (Alaska), a tributary of the Yukon River
Bluebell Creek (Iowa), a minor tributary of the Upper Mississippi River